, also spelled Gotou or Gotoh, is a Japanese surname.  People with the name include:

Artists
Jin Goto (born 1968), Japanese nihonga painter
John Goto (born 1949), British artist known for his montage color photography
Joseph Goto (1920–1994), American sculptor
Keiichirō Gotō (1918–2004), Japanese photographer
Goto Yujo (1440–1512), Japanese artisan and sword fitting maker

Film, television, and video games
Hirohito Gotō (born 1969), Japanese television and stage director
Hiroki Gotō (born 1985), Japanese voice actor
Hiroyuki Goto (born 1973), Japanese game designer and pi reciter
Keiji Gotoh (born 1968), Japanese anime director
Kenji Goto (1967–2015), Japanese freelance video journalist
Mai Goto (voice actress) (born 1982), Japanese voice actress
Risa Goto (born 1983), Japanese actress and gravure idol
Saori Gotō (born 1987), Japanese voice actress
Satoshi Goto (born 1971), Japanese voice actor
Tetsuo Gotō (1950–2018), Japanese voice actor
Yūko Gotō (born 1975), Japanese voice actress
Terumoto Gotō (born 1974), Japanese comedian, member of the duo Football Hour
Toshio Gotō (born 1938), Japanese film director

Musicians
Kumiko Goto (born 1971), Japanese singer 
Maki Goto (born 1985), Japanese singer in Hello!Project
Mariko Gotō, 21st-century Japanese singer
Masafumi Gotoh (born 1976), member of the Japanese rock band Asian Kung-Fu Generation
Midori Gotō (born 1971), Japanese-born American violinist
Ryu Gotō (born 1988), Japanese-American violinist
Suguru Goto, 21st-century Japanese composer and new media artist
, Japanese musician
, Japanese singer and voice actress

Government
Fumio Gotō (1884–1980), Japanese politician and theoretician
Hitoshi Goto (born 1957), Japanese politician, governor of Yamanashi Prefecture
Gotō Morinori (1840–1875), Japanese daimyō of Fukue Domain in what is now Nagasaki Prefecture
Gotō Shinpei (1857–1929), Japanese statesman and cabinet member
Gotō Shōjirō (1838–1897), Japanese politician and leader of the Freedom and People's Rights Movement
Shigeyuki Goto (born 1955), Japanese politician, Liberal Democratic Party member of the House of Representatives

Military and samurai
Aritomo Gotō (1888–1942), Imperial Japanese Navy admiral during World War II
Eiji Gotō (1887–1967), Imperial Japanese Navy admiral during World War II
Jūrō Gotō (1887–1984), Imperial Japanese Army major general during the Second Sino-Japanese War
Fusanosuke Gotō (1879–1924), Imperial Japanese Army soldier
Gotō Mototsugu (1565–1615), Japanese samurai who served the Kuroda and Toyotomi clans
Goto Nobuyasu (1556–1612), Japanese samurai who served the Uesugi clan

Sportspeople
Ai Goto (born 1983), Japanese badminton player
Ayumi Goto (born 1993), Japanese figure skater
, Japanese footballer
, Japanese table tennis player
Hirooki Goto (born 1979), Japanese professional wrestler
, Japanese cross-country skier
Keita Goto (footballer) (born 1986), Japanese footballer
Michi Goto (born 1990), Japanese football forward
Mitsutaka Goto (born 1978), Japanese baseball infielder
Ryo Goto (born 1986), Japanese football forward
Shunta Gotoh (born 1993), Japanese baseball outfielder
Tadaharu Goto (born 1941), Japanese swimmer
, Japanese footballer
Tarzan Goto (born Seiji Gotō, 1963), Japanese professional wrestler
Tatsutoshi Goto (born 1956), Japanese professional wrestler
Teruya Goto (born 1991), Japanese rugby sevens player
Toru Goto (born 1934), Japanese freestyle swimmer
Yoshikazu Goto (born 1964), Japanese football midfielder
Yuji Goto (born 1985), Japanese football midfielder
Yukio Goto (died 1976), Japanese football defender
Yusuke Goto (born 1993), Japanese football forward

Writers
Ben Goto (born 1929), Japanese documentarist and novelist
Cassern "Multilaser" Goto (born 1970), American science fiction writer
Gotō Chūgai (1866–1938), Japanese essayist, novelist and literary critic
Hiromi Goto (born 1966), Japanese-born Canadian fantasy novelist
Meisei Goto (1932–1999), Japanese novelist

Other

Eiichi Goto (1931–2005), Japanese computer scientist
Gotō Zuigan (1879–1965), Japanese Buddhist Rinzai Zen master
Katsu Goto (1862–1889), Japanese merchant, interpreter, and lynching victim
Kazushige Goto, Japanese software engineer known for hand-optimized assembly routines
Keita Gotō (industrialist) (1882–1959), Japanese businessman, founder of the Tokyu Group
Kumiko Goto-Azuma, Japanese Antarctic palaeoclimatologist and glaciologist
Seitarō Gotō (1867–1935), Japanese zoologist and parasitologist
Tadamasa Goto (born 1942), yakuza boss

In fiction
Goto Dengo, a character in the novel Cryptonomicon
Gabriel Goto, a minor character in the Baroque cycle
 Kasumi Goto (Voiced by Kym Hoy), a character from the video game franchise Mass Effect
 The Goto Family, a powerful Yakuza family from The Raid 2
 Hideaki Goto (Kenichi Endō), Yakuza boss, father of Keiichi Goto and head of Goto Family
 Keiichi Goto (Ryuhei Matsuda), son of Hideaki Goto and heir of Goto Family
 Tojiro Goto (Ryousuke Kawamura), a character from the Kamen Rider Fourze 
 Gotō Matabei (Voiced by  Shinichirō Miki), a character of vídeo game Sengoku Basara 4
 Gotou (Voiced by Kazuhiko Inoue in Japanese and Jason Douglas in English for Anime and played by Tadanobu Asano in the Live-action), the main antagonist of Parasyte franchise.
 Shinichi Goto, the main protagonist from Old Boy.
 Jun Gotō (Voiced by Yuko Ono), one of main protagonists from Angel's 3Piece!
 Moka Gotō (Voiced by Anzu Haruno), one of main characters from Clean Freak! Aoyama kun.
 Hidenori Gotō (Voiced by Tomokazu Sugita), one of main characters from Samurai Flamenco.
 Ren Goto (Voiced by Kazuki Shimizu in Japanese and Chris Smith in English), a character from K Project.
 Kosei Goto (Voiced by Tokuyoshi Kawashima), a character from Giant Killing.
 Takuya Gotou (Voiced by Kenjiro Tsuda), a character from Sound! Euphonium.
 Shintaro Goto (Asaya Kimijima), one of main characters from Kamen Rider OOO.
 Hitori Gotō (Voiced by Yoshino Aoyama), one of main characters from Bocchi the Rock!

Japanese-language surnames